Chimarrichthys davidi is a species of sisorid catfish native to Asia.

References

Sisoridae
Fish of Asia
Fish described in 1874